Lieutenant General Đặng Văn Quang (21 June 1929 – 15 July 2011) popularly known as Fat Quang, was an officer of the Army of the Republic of Vietnam who served as a special advisor to President Nguyễn Văn Thiệu of South Vietnam.

Biography
Quang started as a non-commissioned officer (NCO) in the French colonial army and was later promoted to Emperor Bảo Đại’s aide-de-camp, then commander of his personal Imperial Guard. He also was in charge of managing resources for Thiệu. This led to his promotion to Brigadier general.

He commanded the 21st Division from 1 June 1964, until 20 January 1965, when he was promoted to the rank of Lieutenant general, receiving two further stars.

He then served as the commander of IV Corps, which oversaw the Mekong Delta region of the country, replacing Thiệu, who went on to become head of state, until 23 November 1966, when at the urging of Prime Minister Nguyễn Cao Kỳ he was replaced by Major General Nguyen Van Manh. He then became a special adviser to President Thiệu, serving as special advisor on military affairs from 1968 to 1969 and then as advisor of national security and intelligence from 1969 to 1975.

According to Frank Snepp, Quang became an important source of information for the Central Intelligence Agency (CIA) inside the South Vietnamese government and was well rewarded for this. However following the Battle of Ban Me Thuot in March 1975 he failed to inform the CIA of Thiệu's plan to abandon the Central Highlands, jeopardizing the evacuation of Americans and their South Vietnamese staff.

He was not popular with the people of South Vietnam and had a reputation for corruption. He was accused of being the most corrupt officer in South Vietnam. As the North Vietnamese overran the South in 1975 Đăng was reported to charge a US$5,000 bribe for the issuance of an exit visa, rising to US$20,000 as the Fall of Saigon drew closer.

On 29 April 1975 he arrived at the U.S. Embassy where he was evacuated later that day.

He was accused of being involved in the heroin trade, however, these allegations are disputed.

He died on 15 July 2011 at the age of 82.

References

Bibliography
Max Hastings, Vietnam : An Epic Tragedy, 1945 - 1975, Harper Perennial, New York City, October 15, 2019.
馬克斯‧黑斯廷斯（原文作者），譚天（譯者），《越南啟示錄1945-1975：美國的夢魘、亞洲的悲劇》（上、下冊不分售），八旗文化，臺北市，2022/04/08。

1929 births
2011 deaths
Army of the Republic of Vietnam generals
South Vietnamese military personnel of the Vietnam War